Italian submarine Adua was an  built in the 1930s, serving in the Regia Marina during World War II. She was named after Adwa, a town in northern Ethiopia.

Design and description
The Adua-class submarines were essentially repeats of the preceding . They displaced  surfaced and  submerged.

For surface running, the boats were powered by two  diesel engines, each driving one propeller shaft. When submerged each propeller was driven by a  electric motor. They could reach  on the surface and  underwater.

The boats were armed with six internal  torpedo tubes, four in the bow and two in the stern. They were also armed with one  deck gun for combat on the surface. The light anti-aircraft armament consisted of one or two pairs of   machine guns.

Construction and career 
Adua was built at the CRDA shipyard, in Monfalcone. She was laid down on 1 February 1936, launched on 13 September of the same year, and commissioned on 14 November 1936.  After intense 1937 spring training in the waters of the Dodecanese, Greece and Libya, Adua was assigned to the 23rd Squadron based at Naples. In 1939 she was transferred to Cagliari and became part of the 71st Squadron (VII Submarine Group).

On June 10, 1940, at the time of Italy's entrance into World War II, Adua was already at sea, south of Sardinia (between Cape Teulada and the island of La Galite) under command of Giuseppe Roselli Lorenzini. On June 13, she moved to an area between Ibiza and Mallorca and later to the Gulf of Lion fifteen miles east of Cape Creus. During night of June 17, 1940 Adua sighted a destroyer, but could not launch an attack. The following morning, she sighted a French convoy (five merchants and two escorts) on the Marseille – Toulon route. Not being able to approach because of the escort, she launched a single torpedo from 1,800 meters at a larger transport. However, there are no confirmations of any ships being damaged or sunk on this day at this time and this location.

Shortly thereafter, captain Luigi Riccardi assumed command of the submarine.

From October 22, 1940, to March 12, 1941, Adua served as the training vessel at the Pola Submarine School. During this span she carried out 46 training missions. Carlo Todaro and Mario Resio served as her commanders during this time. In mid-March 1941 Adua was transferred back to Taranto, and she was again put under command of captain Luigi Riccardi.

From March to May 1941 Adua was deployed in the Gulf of Taranto, and also off the coast of Greece, carrying out three unsuccessful missions:

In March, forty miles west of Lefkada, then in the Gulf of Taranto;
In April, south of Cape Krio and in Kythira Strait;
In May, between Alexandria and Kasos Strait at first, then south of Crete.

On May 10, 1941, she was transferred to Leros.

At 01:30 on June 3, 1941, she intercepted a small motor barge carrying gasoline and 72 British troops on board, including 8 officers, attempting to reach Egyptian coast. Adua took officers prisoner, and escorted the vessel to Crete, where other soldiers were taken prisoners.

On June 4, 1941, she headed back to Taranto where the submarine underwent a three-month long maintenance at the Arsenal of Taranto.

In the middle of September Adua operated near Menorca returning to Cagliari on September 16.

On September 23, 1941, the submarine left Cagliari to set an ambush on the route of the British convoy to Malta (Operation Halberd) together with three other submarines.  On September 26 Adua was  near Cape Palos, north of Spanish city of Cartagena. The British convoy went undetected and reached Malta. The submarines, including  Adua spotted and attacked British ships on their  return. On September 30, 1941, at 3:50 Adua detected a group of eleven English destroyers, and attacked them with a four-torpedo salvo, but missed them and then moved north. Shortly after at 5:25, Adua sent a radio transmission to the headquarters informing them of British convoy position. She was never heard from again.

Notes

References 
 

Adua-class submarines
World War II submarines of Italy
Lost submarines of Italy
Maritime incidents in September 1941
World War II shipwrecks in the Mediterranean Sea
1936 ships
Ships built by Cantieri Riuniti dell'Adriatico
Ships built in Monfalcone
Ships lost with all hands
Submarines sunk by British warships